Sapporia is a genus of moths of the family Noctuidae.

Species
 Sapporia fasciculata (Leech, 1900)
 Sapporia repetita (Butler, 1885)

References
Natural History Museum Lepidoptera genus database
Sapporia at funet

Hadeninae